Driscoll is a city in Nueces County, Texas, United States. Its population was 680 at the 2020 census, down from 739 at the 2000 census.

History

Driscoll formed around the railroad, which arrived in the area in 1904. The area was named after a local rancher, Robert Driscoll, Jr.

Geography
Driscoll is located at  (27.672549, –97.751059).

Demographics

As of the 2020 United States census, there were 680 people, 194 households, and 180 families residing in the city.

As of the census of 2000,  825 people, 256 households, and 197 families were residing in the city. The population density was 731.4 people/sq mi (281.9/km2). The 297 housing units averaged 263.3/sq mi (101.5/km2). The racial makeup of the city was 55.27% White, 0.48% African American, 0.61% Asian, 0.12% Pacific Islander, 38.18% from other races, and 5.33% from two or more races. Hispanics or Latinos of any race were 84.00% of the population.

Of the 256 households, 37.9% had children under 18 living with them, 59.8% were married couples living together, 14.8% had a female householder with no husband present, and 22.7% were not families. About 20.7% of all households were made up of individuals, and 12.5% had someone living alone who was 65 or older. The average household size was 3.22, and the average family size was 3.72.

In the city, the age distribution was 31.0% under 18, 10.8% from 18 to 24, 24.8% from 25 to 44, 21.2% from 45 to 64, and 12.1% who were 65  or older. The median age was 31 years. For every 100 females, there were 90.1 males. For every 100 females age 18 and over, there were 89.0 males.

The median income for a household in the city was $34,583, and for a family was $35,714. Males had a median income of $28,000 versus $19,750 for females. The per capita income for the city was $11,707. About 14.1% of families and 13.9% of the population were below the poverty line, including 9.1% of those under age 18 and 29.9% of those age 65 or over.

Travel
 U.S. Highway 77 (future Interstate 69E) in Driscoll has the speed limit drop from 70 to 40 mph. Traffic violations are a major source of public revenue.
Corpus Christi International Airport

See also
 Driscoll Independent School District

References

Cities in Texas
Cities in Nueces County, Texas
Cities in the Corpus Christi metropolitan area